List of Guggenheim Fellowships awarded in 2009: Guggenheim Fellowships have been awarded annually since 1925, by the John Simon Guggenheim Memorial Foundation to those "who have demonstrated exceptional capacity for productive scholarship or exceptional creative ability in the arts."

U.S., Canadian and Latin America Fellows

References

2009
2009 awards
2009 art awards